Adharm may refer to:

 Adharm (1992 film)
 Adharm (2006 film)